Josh Downs (born August 12, 2001) is an American football wide receiver for the North Carolina Tar Heels.

High school career
Downs attended North Gwinnett High School in Suwanee, Georgia. During his high school career he had 187 receptions for 3,019 yards and 32 touchdowns. He was selected to play in the 2020 All-American Bowl. He committed to the University of North Carolina at Chapel Hill to play college football.

College career

Freshman
As a true freshman at North Carolina in 2020, Downs appeared in 10 games. Playing primarily on special teams, he had seven receptions for 119 yards and three touchdowns. The first touchdown reception of his college career came against N.C. State in Carolina's 48-21 victory. His breakout performance came in the Orange Bowl, where he filled in for Dyami Brown, who, along with Javonte Williams, Michael Carter, and Chazz Surratt, had opted out of the bowl to prepare for the NFL Draft. Downs caught four passes for 92 yards and two touchdowns, including a 75 yard touchdown on a broken play that gave the Tar Heels a 27–20 lead early in the fourth quarter. He was the team's leading receiver in the 41-27 loss to Texas A&M.

Sophomore
Heading into the 2021 season, Downs was projected to be the team's number one receiver. In the season-opening loss against Virginia Tech, Downs caught eight passes for 123 yards and a touchdown as the Tar Heels failed to mount a successful second half comeback. Two weeks later against Virginia, he caught eight passes for 203 receiving yards and two touchdowns, setting a career high in the process. Downs' 203 receiving yards against the Cavaliers were the eighth most in a single game in Tar Heel history. Against Wake Forest, he only caught four passes for 35 yards, both season lows. However, his 35 receiving yards against the Demon Deacons made him just the seventh player in school history to gain 1,000 or more receiving yards in a single season. With eight receptions against Wofford, Downs moved into second place behind Ryan Switzer for most receptions in a single season as a Tar Heel with 90.

In the regular season finale, a 34–30 loss against NC State, Downs broke both Switzer's single season receptions record and Hakeem Nicks' single season receiving yards record. He recorded three more catches in the Duke's Mayo Bowl loss to South Carolina, finishing his record-breaking 2021 season with 101 catches for 1,335 yards and eight touchdowns.

Junior
Solidified as the Tar Heels' top receiver after his record-setting sophomore season, Downs is once again a featured piece in the Tar Heel offense. He was named to the preseason All-ACC team at the wide receiver and specialist (punt returner) positions, and was selected to the preseason AP All-American second-team at the wide receiver position. 

In the season opener against FAMU, Downs recorded 9 catches for 78 yards and two scores. On his final catch of the game, Downs was injured and missed the next two games against Appalachian State and Georgia State. He returned against Notre Dame, and caught 5 passes for 32 yards and two touchdowns in the Tar Heels' 45–32 loss. Against Miami, Downs caught another touchdown pass, moving him into to a tie for tenth place all time in Carolina history with 16 receiving touchdowns. He continued to post solid statistics the rest of the regular season, recording four games with 11-plus receptions, and recording another 1,000 yard receiving season. Against Wake Forest, he caught three touchdown passes, moving him to second all-time behind Quinshad Davis for UNC career touchdown receptions with 22. In what was his final game as a Tar Heel, the 2022 ACC Championship Game against Clemson, Downs caught 11 passes for 100 yards in the 39–10 loss to the Tigers. 

Downs finished his Carolina career with 2,483 receiving yards (the fourth most in school history), 202 career receptions (third most at UNC), and multiple school records at the wide receiver position. He declared for the NFL draft following conference championship week, opting out of the Holiday Bowl in the process.

Statistics

Personal life
Downs' father, Gary, played college football for NC State and is now an assistant coach. His uncle, Dré Bly, also played with the Tar Heels before spending 11 years in the NFL.

References

External links

North Carolina Tar Heels bio

Living people
People from Suwanee, Georgia
Players of American football from Georgia (U.S. state)
American football wide receivers
North Carolina Tar Heels football players
2001 births